Alice Maher  (born 1956)  is a contemporary Irish artist working in a variety of media, including sculpture, photography and installation.

Education
Maher was born in Kilmoyler, near Bansha, County Tipperary and received her early education at Ballydrehid National School and at Coláiste Chríost Rí, Cahir. She later graduated from the University of Limerick and the Crawford College of Art in Cork. Then she undertook an MA at the University of Ulster, Belfast in 1985 and 1986. Maher spent time in San Francisco Art Institute in 1986 as a Fulbright Scholar.

Career

Maher works in a range of media, often from outside the tradition of fine art and more from the natural and domestic world, such as hair, nettles, bees and thorns. She has explored the themes of childhood and death, such as Mnemosyne, 2003, wherein she creates a bedlike structure constructed from refrigerator coils; when the coils become frosty they gleam a luminous white sheen. She is interested in how identities, particularly gendered identities, are constructed by history and culture.

Exhibitions 
Maher's work was the subject of a survey show at the Irish Museum of Modern Art, IMMA, in 2012 titled Becoming. The exhibition took place in the IMMA's temporary location at Earlsfort Terrace as the museum was undergoing renovations at the time. Maher represented Ireland at the São Paulo Art Biennial in 1994.

Collaborations 
Maher has collaborated with artists from a range of disciplines. She collaborated with the composer Trevor Knight since 1999. Knight has produced soundtracks for her animated videos. Visitant, a live show combining dance, music and visual art, was a collaboration between Maher, Knight, the Butoh dancer Gyohei Zaitsu and musician Áine O'Dwyer. Visitant was performed at the Project Arts Centre in 2014.

Maher's film Cassandra's Necklace, produced for her retrospective exhibition at IMMA in 2015, was based on an unpublished script by Irish writer Anne Enright and features the actress Charlie Murphy.

In 2018, Maher collaborated with the poet Doireann Ní Ghríofa on the book Nine Silences published by Salvage Press.

Collections
Berry Dress, 1994, The Irish Museum of Modern Art, Dublin
The Arts Council of Ireland including
Nettle Coat (1996)
The Crawford Gallery, Cork, including
Irish Dancers (1992)
Fairytale Wall (2002), Special Investigation Unit, Level 2, Royal Victoria Hospital, Belfast

Bibliography 
 Maher, Alices, Reservoir (Dublin: Roads Publishing, 2014) was a collection of the artist's sketchbooks
 Allen Randolph, Jody. "Alice Maher, August 2009." Close to the Next Moment: Interviews from a Changing Ireland. Manchester: Carcanet, 2010.
 Barber, Fiona. Familiar [essay]. Dublin: Douglas Hyde Gallery; Derry: Orchard Gallery, 1995.
 Bourne, Cecile. Familiar [interview]. Dublin: Douglas Hyde Gallery; Derry: Orchard Gallery, 1995.
 Deepwell, Katy. "Alice Maher." Dialogues: Women Artists from Ireland. London: IB Tauris, 2005.
 Dickinson, Sheila. ‘Alice Maher, Rood’, Circa Magazine (Winter 2005), No. 114, pp. 86 – 87.
 Ruane, Mebd. 'A Sting in the Tail.' Profile: Alice Maher. Cork: Gandon Editions, 1998. 5-10.

References

External links

Official website
Alice Maher at Green on Red Gallery, Dublin
Aosdána short biography
Isabel Nolan (2003) review of Mnemosyne in Circa 104.
Chérie Driver (2003) review of Portraits in Circa 106.
Dorothy Walker (2002) Maher, Alice in Brian Lalor (Ed.), The Encyclopedia of Ireland. Dublin: Gill & Macmillan. 

1956 births
Living people
20th-century Irish painters
21st-century Irish painters
20th-century Irish sculptors
20th-century Irish women artists
21st-century Irish women artists
Irish contemporary artists
Alumni of Cork Institute of Technology
Aosdána members
Irish women painters
People from County Tipperary